Lixières is a surname. Notable people with the surname include:

 Bourlon de Lixières (1788–after 1838), French officer

See also
 Fléville-Lixières, a town in France